Henry Beaumont may refer to:
Henry Beaumont (magistrate), English MP for Derby
 Sir Henry Beaumont (of Gracedieu) (1581–1605), English MP for Leicester, 1604
Sir Henry Beaumont (died 1607) ( 1545–1607), English MP for Leicestershire, 1589, 1606
Sir Henry Beaumont, 2nd Baronet (1638–1689), English MP for Leicester
Henry Frederick Beaumont (1833–1913), British MP for Yorkshire South and for Colne Valley
Henry Beaumont (priest) (died 1627), Canon of Windsor
Henry Beamont, known as Henry Harcourt (1612–1673),  English Jesuit

See also
Henry de Beaumont (disambiguation)
Harry Beaumont (1888–1966), American film director
Harry Beaumont (rugby league), English rugby league footballer of the 1900s
Beaumont (disambiguation)